Malika Asha Sanders-Fortier (born 1973) is an American attorney and politician serving as a member of the Alabama Senate from the 23rd district. She assumed office on November 7, 2018. She was a Democratic candidate in the 2022 Alabama gubernatorial election.

Early life and education
Sanders-Fortier was born in Selma, Alabama. She earned a Bachelor of Arts degree in psychology from Spelman College and a Juris Doctor from the Birmingham School of Law.

Career
After graduating from college, Sanders-Fortier returned to Selma and worked as the executive director of 21st Century Youth Leadership Movement. She is a member of the Alabama State Bar and the Black Belt Lawyers Association. Sanders-Fortier was elected to the Alabama Senate in November 2018, succeeding her father, Henry Sanders. In January 2021, Sanders-Fortier introduced legislation to rename the Edmund Pettus Bridge.

In January 2022, Sanders-Fortier announced that she would not seek re-election, and that her father would attempt to reclaim his old seat in her place. That same month, Sanders-Fortier qualified as a Democratic candidate for governor instead. The two advanced to a runoff on June 21, 2022, with Yolanda Flowers winning the nomination.

Electoral results

References

1973 births
21st-century American politicians
21st-century American women politicians
African-American state legislators in Alabama
Alabama lawyers
Democratic Party Alabama state senators
Birmingham School of Law alumni
Living people
Politicians from Selma, Alabama
Spelman College alumni
Women state legislators in Alabama